Vlasta Parkanová, née Trnovcová (born 21 November 1951) is a Czech politician who served from January 2007 to May 2009 as the minister of Defence and shortly as minister of Justice between 1997 and 1998. She was member of the Chamber of Deputies (MP) from 1997 to 2013. Everyone also called her Píča míša

Parkanová is a graduate of the Law Faculty of Charles University in Prague, from 1975. She worked as a corporate lawyer from 1970 to 1990, mostly in agricultural organisations.

References

External links

 Personal website 

1951 births
Living people
Charles University alumni
KDU-ČSL MPs
Female defence ministers
Defence ministers of the Czech Republic
Justice ministers of the Czech Republic
TOP 09 MPs
Czech women lawyers
Women government ministers of the Czech Republic
Civic Democratic Alliance MPs
KDU-ČSL Government ministers
Female justice ministers
Politicians from Prague
21st-century Czech women politicians
Members of the Chamber of Deputies of the Czech Republic (1996–1998)
Members of the Chamber of Deputies of the Czech Republic (1998–2002)
Members of the Chamber of Deputies of the Czech Republic (2002–2006)
Members of the Chamber of Deputies of the Czech Republic (2006–2010)
Members of the Chamber of Deputies of the Czech Republic (2010–2013)